The D 80 (Salahuddin Road)  is a road passing in Al Muraqqabat, Al Muteena and Al Khabisi in one of UAE emirates,Dubai, United Arab Emirates

Roads in the United Arab Emirates